Clear Brook is an unincorporated farming community in northern Frederick County, Virginia. The community lies approximately six miles (9.6 kilometers) north of the county seat of Winchester along Martinsburg Pike (U.S. Route 11). It is the site of the Kenilworth home, once owned by Harry K. Thaw, the old Hopewell Meeting House, Stonewall Elementary School, the Clearbrook Park, and the Frederick County Fairgrounds.

Sometimes referred to as Clearbrook, its name was decided upon by the Board on Geographic Names in 1966 as Clear Brook.

Clear Brook drew national attention when resident and Quaker peace activist Tom Fox was kidnapped in Baghdad on November 25, 2005.  Fox's body was found March 9, 2006.

Culture
Clear Brook was selected as the site for the Hogging Up BBQ & Music Festival, a Kansas City Barbeque Society sanctioned event deemed a "State Championship" by the Governor of Virginia for 2013. The event is an annual event supporting local charities under the guidance of Wayne Schafer, a barbecue pitmaster who runs the event.

Clear Brook is well known throughout Northern Virginia as well as the Route 11 and Highway 81 corridors for its annual holiday light display in Clear Brook Park. The light display typically opens the day after Thanksgiving and runs through early January.  The display is turned off at 10pm each night and is also closed on Christmas Eve, Christmas Day, and New Year's Eve.

External links 

 Trelleborg Marine Systems produces marine fenders in Clear Brook
 Family Dining in Clear Brook, VA

References

Unincorporated communities in Frederick County, Virginia
Unincorporated communities in Virginia